Peter Julian Basil Biggs is a Falkland Island politician who has served as a Member of the Legislative Assembly for the Stanley constituency since the 2021 general election.

References 

Living people
Falkland Islands MLAs 2021–2025
Year of birth missing (living people)